Mikhail Ivanovich Pugovkin (July 13, 1923, Rameshki, Chukhlomsky District of Kostroma Oblast —  July 25, 2008, Moscow) (aged 85) was a Soviet and Russian comic actor named a People's Artist of the USSR in 1988.

He studied in the Moscow Art Theatre school under Ivan Moskvin, took part in World War II and, following demobilisation, was featured in the 1944 all-star cast adaptation of Anton Chekhov's The Wedding. Another step to stardom was the 1967 comedy Wedding in Malinovka.

Pugovkin went on to appear in more than 100 films. His roles in Leonid Gaidai's comedies, such as Operation Y and Other Shurik's Adventures (1965), Twelve Chairs (1971), Ivan Vasilievich: Back to the Future (1973) and Borrowing Matchsticks (1980) made him one of the most popular comedians of the former Soviet Union.

Pugovkin lived in Yalta, Crimea before moving to Moscow in 1999. A statue of Father Fyodor from The Twelve Chairs portrayed by Pugovkin was unveiled in Kharkiv, Ukraine in 2001.

Pugovkin died on July 25, 2008 in his house in Moscow. He was buried on July 29 at Vagankovo Cemetery.

Filmography

Honours and awards
Order of Merit for the Fatherland 4th class
Order of Honour
Order of the Patriotic War 2nd class
Order of the Badge of Honour
Medal of Zhukov
Jubilee Medal "50 Years of Victory in the Great Patriotic War 1941-1945"
Medal "For the Victory over Germany in the Great Patriotic War 1941–1945"
Medal "Veteran of Labour"
Jubilee Medal "300 Years of the Russian Navy"
Medal "In Commemoration of the 850th Anniversary of Moscow"
Ukrainian Order of Merit 3rd class

References

External links
 
 Official website

1923 births
2008 deaths
People from Chukhlomsky District
Russian male actors
Soviet male actors
People's Artists of the USSR
Burials at Vagankovo Cemetery
Deaths from diabetes
Recipients of the Order of Honour (Russia)
Recipients of the Medal of Zhukov
People's Artists of the RSFSR
World War II spies for the Soviet Union
Moscow Art Theatre School alumni